Nkandla is a town in the uThungulu district of KwaZulu-Natal, South Africa. It is the seat of the Nkandla Local Municipality, and the district in which the residence of the former  President of South Africa, Jacob Zuma, is located. The residence is located 40 kilometres to the south of the town of Nkandla, beyond the Nkandla Forest and on the road to Kranskop. 

The Nkandla region encompasses nearly 115,000 inhabitants, spread relatively sparsely over a large area.  Nkandla is mainly a rural area and is in the top five of the poorest places in KwaZulu-Natal province. Poverty is prevalent, with 44% unemployment. The majority of the population are Zulus.

A 2004 documentary, The Orphans of Nkandla, by the BBC and Truevision, recounted the hardships and poverty of orphans in Nkandla.

Zuma was joined by Nelson Mandela to open Mnyakanya High School in 2004.

Geographic location

References
 

Populated places in the Nkandla Local Municipality